Wouterus Jacobus Antonius "Björn" van der Doelen (born 24 August 1976) is a Dutch former professional footballer who played as a midfielder.

Club career
Van der Doelen was born in Goirle, Netherlands. He started his professional career for PSV Eindhoven in the 1994–95 season in the Dutch highest league, Eredivisie. Later on Van der Doelen played for Standard Liège (Belgium), FC Twente and NEC

International career
He was a member of the Dutch squad at the 1995 FIFA World Youth Championship.

Music career
In recent years, Van der Doelen started a career as singer/songwriter, first in the band Allez Soldaat, with band members Maarten van der Zanden (guitar), Steffen Pauws (bass) and Jules Fransen (drums). Later, using his own name.

He also made a song about the city Nijmegen, as a declaration of love for the city and for the club he loved most to play football for.

References

External links
  Profile
  Fansite

1976 births
Living people
People from Goirle
Dutch footballers
Footballers from North Brabant
Association football midfielders
Netherlands under-21 international footballers
Netherlands youth international footballers
PSV Eindhoven players
Van Der Doelen Bjorn
FC Twente players
NEC Nijmegen players
Eredivisie players
Belgian Pro League players
Dutch expatriate footballers
Dutch expatriate sportspeople in Belgium
Expatriate footballers in Belgium
Dutch singer-songwriters
21st-century Dutch singers